Sapois may refer to:
Sapois, Jura, a commune in the French region of Franche-Comté
Sapois, Vosges, a commune in the French region of Lorraine